Robert Cunliffe (born 16 December 1950) is a Canadian rower. He competed in the men's coxed four event at the 1972 Summer Olympics.

References

1950 births
Living people
Canadian male rowers
Olympic rowers of Canada
Rowers at the 1972 Summer Olympics
Rowers from Vancouver
Pan American Games medalists in rowing
Pan American Games bronze medalists for Canada
Rowers at the 1971 Pan American Games
20th-century Canadian people